The 2011 Paradise Jam was an early-season men's and women's college basketball tournament. The tournament, which began in 2000, was part of the 2011-12 NCAA Division I men's basketball season and 2011-12 NCAA Division I women's basketball season.  The tournament was played at the Sports and Fitness Center in Saint Thomas, U.S. Virgin Islands, Marquette won the men's tournament, in the women's tournament Alabama won the women's Island Division and Michigan won the women's Reef Division.

Men's tournament

Marquette had an easy path to the final game, then were tested. In the opening round, Marquette beat Winthrop easily 95–73, while Norfolk State beat Drexel by five points, 61–56. In the semifinals, Marquette again won easily, beating Ole Miss 96–66, while Norfolk State beat TCU 66–53 to set up the final. Marquette had played Norfolk State just a week earlier in Milwaukee, in a game that was never in doubt. Marquette opened up a 6–0 lead, expanded the lead to eleven by halftime, then scored 59 points in the second half to win 99–68.

When the two teams met in the Paradise Jam final, the game started out similarly to the early game, with Marquette never trailing, and reaching a nine-point lead at halftime. However, instead of scoring 59 points in the second half, they would score only 59 points in the game. The Golden Eagles, ranked 16th in the AP poll, held a 14-point lead at one time, but the Spartans had two 7–0 runs and tied up the game at 57 points apiece with just over two minutes left. Marquette scored to take a lead; Norfolk State had a chance to tie in the closing seconds but failed to hit the basket, and Marquette won the 2011 Paradise Jam 59–57.

Bracket

Women's tournament

The woman's tournament is organized as two divisions of four teams, each playing each other in a round-robin format.

Participating Teams
Island Division
 Alabama
 Seton Hall
 Louisiana Tech
 Old Dominion

Reef Division
 Michigan
 Washington State
 Marquette
 Prairie View A&M

Overview

Island Division
Alabama and Seton Hall ended with records of 2–1. Alabama won the division by beating Seton Hall in their match up. Alabama's Ericka Russell of Alabama was named Island MVP.

Reef Division
Michigan won all three of their games to capture the (Reef Division) championship. Courtney Boylan of Michigan was named Reef MVP.

References

Paradise Jam Tournament
Paradise Jam
Paradise Jam